Kapata Nataka Paatradhaari is a 2019 Indian Kannada-language suspense horror drama film directed by newcomer Krish and starring Balu Nagendra and Sangeetha Bhat.

Cast 
Balu Nagendra as Krishna
Sangeetha Bhat as Rukmini
Kari Subbu

Soundtrack 
The music for the film was composed by Adil Nadaf.

Reception 
Sunayana Suresh of The Times of India opined that "Balu Nagendra and Sangeetha Bhat star in this film that is an interesting concoction of drama, comedy, horror as well as a bit of the supernatural". Shashiprasad S. M. of Deccan Chronicle said that "Anyone seeking for a real good horror/suspense thriller, do watch this haunted auto rickshaw by Krish, for an assured spooky and entertaining ride". A. Sharadhaa of The New Indian Express wrote that "A haunted auto-rickshaw sounds strange as the focal point of a movie, but this is how director Krish draws the audience to his unconventional flick". Shyam Prasad S. of Bangalore Mirror stated that "With a bare minimum of characters, the plot manages to the audience hooked".

References